Sir John Clerke (1683-1727) was an English politician for a Surrey constituency in the  early eighteenth century.

Clerke was the son of William Clerke, 3rd Baronet. He was elected the Tory  M.P. for Haslemere in 1710; and tried to contest the seat in 1713 but was not backed.

Notes

 

[[Barons in the Peerage of Great Britain

People from Farnham
1683 births
1727 deaths
17th-century English people
18th-century English people
British MPs 1710–1713